RDV may refer to:

 Rice dwarf virus, a plant pathogenic virus
 RDV 01 Crystal, a former research vessel of the Royal Navy
 RDV Sports, Inc., a Michigan, US corporation owned by Richard DeVos
 RDV Sportsplex, a Florida, US sports and recreation complex owned by DeVos
 Radio Dunyaa Vision, a Senegalese broadcast station
 Remdesivir, an antiviral medication